Daniel Boone Wright (February 17, 1812 – December 27, 1887) was an American secessionist, lawyer and politician who served two terms as a U.S. Representative from Mississippi from 1853 to 1857.  He fought against the United States in the Civil War.

Biography 
Born near Mount Pleasant, Tennessee, Wright attended the common schools and was graduated from Cumberland University, Lebanon, Tennessee, in 1837.
He studied law.
He was admitted to the bar in 1840 and commenced practice in Ashland, Mississippi.
He moved to Salem, Benton County, Mississippi, in 1850 and continued the practice of law and also engaged in agricultural pursuits.

Wright owned slaves.

Congress 
Wright was elected as a Democrat to the Thirty-third and Thirty-fourth Congresses (March 4, 1853 – March 3, 1857).
He was not a candidate for renomination in 1856.
He resumed the practice of law at Ashland, Mississippi.

Civil War 
During the Civil War was appointed, on April 16, 1862, lieutenant colonel of the Thirty-fourth Regiment of Mississippi Infantry in the Confederate States Army.
He was appointed colonel of Cavalry to take effect June 6, 1864, and served as a judge of military courts in Gen. N.B. Forrest's Cavalry Division.

Later career and death 
He resumed the practice of his profession in Ashland, Mississippi, and was also interested in agricultural pursuits in Benton County.

He died in Ashland, Mississippi, December 27, 1887.
He was interred in the McDonald (private) Cemetery, near Ashland, Mississippi.

References

External links

1812 births
1887 deaths
Confederate States Army officers
Democratic Party members of the United States House of Representatives from Mississippi
19th-century American politicians
People from Mount Pleasant, Tennessee
People from Benton County, Mississippi
People from Ashland, Mississippi
People of Mississippi in the American Civil War